James McCall may refer to:

 James McCall (politician) (1774–1856), American merchant and politician from New York
 James McCall (veterinary surgeon) (1834–1915), founder and the first principal of Glasgow Veterinary College
 James McCall (footballer) (1865–1925), Scottish footballer
 James F. McCall, United States Army general
 Nocando (James McCall, born 1983), American rapper
 James McCall, rapper with hip-hop duo Zay Hilfigerrr & Zayion McCall
 James McCall, founder of the magazine McCall's